Indian Creek flows into the Black River where the Black River enters Kayuta Lake near Bardwell Mill, New York.

References 

Rivers of Oneida County, New York
Rivers of New York (state)